Nawabzada Muhammad Shahabuddin Khan (Urdu: شہاب الدین خان‬) was the last Khan of Jandol, a princely state that is now part of Lower Dir District, Pakistan from 1947 to 1969. He is remembered for building schools, hospitals, forts and roads but also for his absolute rule over the region, which ended when Pakistan took control of Dir after local unrest.

Life
He was the second son of Nawab of Dir Shah Jehan Khan.

References

External links 
 Official Facebook Page by Royal Family 

Nawabzada Shahabuddin